Introduced in 1906 by David Lloyd George, then President of the Board of Trade, the Merchant Shipping Act established regulations covering the standards of food and accommodation on British registered ships. It was part of a number of acts introduced by David Lloyd George, and later Winston Churchill, as President of the Board of Trade, to improve conditions for workers.

See also
Merchant Shipping Act

References

United Kingdom Acts of Parliament 1906
1906 in law
Shipping in the United Kingdom